Bonner Springs is a city in Wyandotte, Leavenworth, and Johnson counties, Kansas, United States.  It is part of the Kansas City Metropolitan Area.  As of the 2020 census, the population of the city was 7,837.  Bonner Springs was incorporated as a city on November 10, 1898. Bonner Springs is home to the Azura Amphitheater (commonly known as the Sandstone Amphitheater), the National Agricultural Center and Hall of Fame, Wyandotte County Historical Museum, and the annual Kansas City Renaissance Festival.

History

Early settlers 
The Kanza people had settled the area because of the mineral springs and abundant fish and game when, in 1812, two French fur traders, the Chouteau brothers, made their way from St. Louis and temporally settled in the area that would eventually become Bonner Springs, starting a trading post named "Four Houses". The location allowed easy access to trade items, and a ferry to cross the Kansas River was added. With a date of 1812, it is reputed to be the first commercial center and permanent settlement in Kansas. In 1830, Henry Tiblow, a Delaware Indian, took charge of the ferry. Tiblow was a Delaware Indian who worked as an interpreter for the government. He lived in a small cabin on the west side of the city.

The location became known as "Tiblow Settlement", and the ferry continued working for years. John McDanield, or "Red John" due to hair color, is known as the founder of Bonner Springs - as we know it today. As the owner of a vast majority of land that is now Bonner Springs, McDaniel named the town "Tiblow", after his friend Henry.

Mineral springs 
Several of the springs in the area were analysed for their mineral content, and the results indicated benefits that would attract visitors. The Bonner Springs Improvement Club, in 1907, created a promotional brochure touting the city as the "Kansas Karlsbad" and listing the contents of five springs near Lake of the Woods: Big Chief, Little Chief, Papoose, Old Squaw and Minnehaha. They listed "grains per gallon" of things like potassium sulphate, carbonate of iron, and chloride of sodium for each.

Big Chief was noted to be "splendid water for anemics, supplying the necessary properties for good red blood and driving out the dead and impure corpuscles."

Old Squaw was reportedly so named because "the old women of Indian tribes once living in Kansas found relief from their intense dyspepsia caused by their heavy meat diet and little or no exercise."

To promote the springs, a special train brought investors to the area and cited its proximity to Kansas City, the springs themselves, the fine parks and native trees, the site of a racetrack, and the beautiful residential sites as advantages that would assure the success of the mineral spring venture. In 1885, Philo Clark purchased  from McDanield, with plans to capitalize on the mineral springs, then changed the name of the town to "Bonner Springs". The latter portion of the name comes from a mineral spring in the area said to have medicinal qualities. The town was named after Robert E. Bonner, a publisher of the New York Ledger, who was a trotting-horse breeder of note, and Clark believed would help fund the proposed racetrack. However, there is no record this occurred.

Fire of 1908 

Bonner Springs continued to be prosperous, with a growing population and new businesses. In 1908, a fire caused over $70,000 worth of damage ($ in  dollars) and destroyed between 19 and 21 local businesses. There were no water mains at the time, even though the city council had debated the issue for some time.

Many locals came to the rescue, forming a water bucket chain to help put out the fire, while they waited for a fire truck from Kansas City to arrive. An investigation indicated that materials behind Kelly & Pettit's Drug Store had caught on fire, and the winds carried the flames, making the fire difficult to control. Residents of Bonner Springs undertook thousands of dollars worth of repairs.

Geography
Bonner Springs is located at  (39.0597260, −94.8835754), primarily on the north side of the Kansas River. It is mainly in southwestern Wyandotte County, with small portions extending west into Leavenworth County and south across the Kansas River into Johnson County. It is bordered to the north by Kansas City, Kansas, to the east by Edwardsville, and to the south across the Kansas River by Shawnee. Interstate 70, the Kansas Turnpike, passes through the northern part of the city, with access from Exits 224 and 224A (U.S. Route 73 and Kansas Highway 7). I-70 leads east  to Kansas City, Missouri, and west  to Lawrence, while US-73 leads north  to Leavenworth, and K-7 leads south the same distance to Olathe. K-32 runs through the center of Bonner Springs close to the Kansas River, leading east  into Edwardsville and west  to Linwood.

Climate
Bonner Springs has a humid continental climate, typically experiencing hot, humid summers and cold, dry winters.

Demographics

2010 census
As of the census of 2010, there were 7,314 people, 2,810 households, and 1,917 families residing in the city. The racial makeup of the city was 84.8% White, 5.4% African American, 0.9% Native American, 0.5% Asian, 0.1% Pacific Islander, 5.0% from other races, and 3.3% from two or more races. Hispanic or Latino of any race were 10.8% of the population.

There were 2,810 households, of which 35.2% had children under the age of 18 living with them, 48.6% were married couples living together, 14.2% had a female householder with no husband present, 5.5% had a male householder with no wife present, and 31.8% were non-families. 25.7% of all households were made up of individuals, and 9.8% had someone living alone who was 65 years of age or older. The average household size was 2.59 and the average family size was 3.11.

The median age in the city was 35.7 years. 26.5% of residents were under the age of 18; 8.8% were between the ages of 18 and 24; 26.8% were from 25 to 44; 26.2% were from 45 to 64; and 11.8% were 65 years of age or older. The gender makeup of the city was 47.9% male and 52.1% female.

2000 census
As of the census of 2000, there were 6,768 people, 2,592 households, and 1,824 families residing in the city. The racial makeup of the city was 90.2% White, 4.1% African American, 0.8% Native American, 0.5% Asian, 2.7% from other races, and 1.7% from two or more races. Hispanic or Latino of any race were 6.2% of the population. 22.1% were of German, 13.3% American, 12.8% Irish and 10.9% English ancestry.

There were 2,592 households, out of which 35.8% had children under the age of 18 living with them, 53.5% were married couples living together, 12.6% had a female householder with no husband present, and 29.6% were non-families. 24.7% of all households were made up of individuals, and 10.8% had someone living alone who was 65 years of age or older. The average household size was 2.59 and the average family size was 3.11.

In the city, the population was spread out, with 28.2% under the age of 18, 8.5% from 18 to 24, 29.8% from 25 to 44, 20.7% from 45 to 64, and 12.8% who were 65 years of age or older. The median age was 34 years. For every 100 females, there were 93.7 males. For every 100 females age 18 and over, there were 87.2 males.

As of 2000 the median income for a household in the city was $43,234, and the median income for a family was $50,476. Males had a median income of $36,390 versus $26,957 for females. The per capita income for the city was $19,730. About 6.8% of families and 9.6% of the population were below the poverty line, including 12.9% of those under age 18 and 5.4% of those age 65 or over.

Arts and culture

Azura Amphitheater

Bonner Springs is home to the Azura Amphitheater, first opened in 1984 as the Sandstone Amphitheater. This open-air venue can seat an 18,000 guests, including 3,100 box and reserved seats. The venue has undergone renovations, including an improved layout for seating and state-of-the-art sound and video systems.

National Agricultural Center and Hall of Fame

Bonner Springs is home to the National Agricultural Center and Hall of Fame, a privately funded charitable institution chartered by the U.S. Congress to "educate society on the historical and present value of American agriculture and to honor leadership in Agri-Business and Academia by providing education, information, experience and recognition."

Kansas City Renaissance Festival
The city is host of the annual Kansas City Renaissance Festival. The fair begins on Labor Day weekend and continues for seven weekends, open on Saturdays and Sundays as well as Labor Day and Columbus Day. The fair began in 1977 as a benefit for the Kansas City Art Institute, and became a stand-alone event in the late 1990s. The fair has 165 booths and 13 stages, entertaining 180,000 patrons annually on 16 operating days.

Wyandotte County Park
Wyandotte County Park has numerous picnic areas with A-frame structures. The park also includes soccer fields, tennis courts, a skate park, disc golf course, a model airplane flying area, and baseball diamonds. The Park is home to numerous attractions, including the Wyandotte County Museum and Historical Society, Trowbridge Archival Library, and the George Meyn Community Center.

Sunflower Hills Golf Course
Sunflower Hills Golf Course, opened in 1977, is an 18-hole course located at Wyandotte County Park. The championship Golf course was designed by renowned architect Roger Packard. Sunflower Hills is home to the Wyandotte County Open, the longest running tournament of its kind in the Greater Kansas City area.

The Junior golf course features six holes with three sets of tees, driving range, putting green and practice bunker.

Tiblow Days
Each year, during the last weekend of August, the city hosts Tiblow Days, a heritage festival in honor of early settler Henry Tiblow, and former namesake of the community.

Government

The Bonner Springs City Council consists of nine members who are elected in non-partisan elections across four wards. The mayor is elected at large, and together with the council, select and appoint a professional city manager to operate the city. Operating as the legislative branch of the city, the council provides policy direction to the city manager.

The vast majority of Bonner Springs lies in Wyandotte County as the other parts of Bonner Springs lie in neighboring Leavenworth and Johnson County. Bonner Springs acts as an incorporated city - retaining its own government and autonomy - while also being part of the consolidated city-county government known as the "Unified Government". The UG consolidates the governmental functions of Wyandotte County and Kansas City, Kansas, under one entity, while also performing typical county government functions for the incorporated cities of Bonner Springs and Edwardsville.

Education
The city is served by Bonner Springs–Edwardsville USD 204 public school district, which includes Bonner Springs High School, Robert E. Clark Middle School, and three elementary schools, Bonner Springs Elementary School, Delaware Ridge Elementary School, and Edwardsville Elementary school.

Bonner Springs residents also contribute to funding Kansas City Kansas Community College.

Public Library
The City of Bonner Springs operates one library, the Bonner Springs City Library.

Infrastructure

Utilities
Bonner Springs is served by the following utilities:
 Natural Gas Service - Atmos.
 Electrical Service - Evergy.
 Water & Sewer Service - City of Bonner Springs supplies water and sewer service to the City.
 Cable Television - Spectrum Internet and AT&T
 Telephone Service - Spectrum Internet and AT&T.

Transportation
''See related article: voy:Kansas City (Missouri) at Wikivoyage

River transportation was important to early Bonner Springs, as its location directly on the Kansas River afforded easy access to trade. A portion of Interstate 70 was the first project in the United States completed under the provisions of the new Federal-Aid Highway Act of 1956 (though not the first constructed or to begin construction). Bonner Springs is located directly on or near several transportation corridors including roadways, rail, and river access.

Road transportation
Bonner Springs is served directly by two interstate highways, three national highways, three state highways.

 State Avenue

Direct routes
Bonner Springs is served with direct routes to one interstate highway, two state highways and one national highway:

Notable people
Notable individuals who were born in and/or have lived in Bonner Springs include:
 Gene Clark (1944-1991), singer and founding member of The Byrds
 David Jaynes (1952- ), football quarterback
 Ed Nealy (1960- ), basketball power forward
 Myra Taylor (1917-2011), jazz singer-songwriter
 Bobby Watson (1953- ), saxophonist

See also
 Great Flood of 1951

References

Further reading

External links

 City of Bonner Springs official website
 Bonner Springs – Directory of Public Officials
 Bonner Springs city map, BonnerSprings.org
 Bonner Springs city map, KDOT

Cities in Kansas
Kansas City metropolitan area
Cities in Johnson County, Kansas
Cities in Leavenworth County, Kansas
Cities in Wyandotte County, Kansas
1855 establishments in Kansas Territory